TIP Trailer Services was founded in 1968, as Transport International Pool Inc. TIP specializes in short-term and long-term rental and leasing to customers in the Netherlands and Canada. TIP's headquarters are located in Amsterdam, Netherlands. It operates in 18 countries, on two continents. TIP has a large network of maintenance points located throughout European and Canadian cities.

History 
In 1993, TIP was acquired by GE Capital. With GE Capital, TIP expanded its European network and began expanding. In 2007, TIP expanded its offer by introducing services like maintenance and repair services as well as telematics. In October 2013, TIP was acquired by HNA Group, a Chinese conglomerate. In 2016, TIP Trailer Services Group acquired Train Trailer Rental Ltd, a Canadian provider of trailer rentals, leasing and storage. In that same year TIP acquired Dutch rental and leasing company Twan Heetkamp Trailers (THT), which had a fleet of around 3,000 trailers operating across Europe.

In 2018, HNA Group sold its European TIP subsidiary to I Squared Capital for a sum of around €1 billion. In August 2018, I Squared Capital (ISQ) acquired 100 percent interest in TIP.

References

Companies based in Amsterdam
Leasing companies
Companies established in 1968